Risk: The World Conquest Game is a computer game developed by Virgin Mastertronic International in 1989 for DOS.

Gameplay
This game is based on the board game Risk. The player can select as many as five computer opponents. The player can play either the British or American version of the game, including the extra armies cards.

Reception
Computer Gaming World stated that while the computer version offered the convenience of an automated opponent for solitary players, the board game would likely be more fun for most because they would not have to crowd around the computer, which could not easily display the entire world at once.

M. Evan Brooks reviewed the computer editions of Risk, Monopoly, Scrabble, and Clue for Computer Gaming World, and stated that "In this reviewer's opinion, Scrabble is the weakest product (given cumbersome play and graphics), while Risk and Clue: Master Detective are the strongest."

The game was reviewed in 1990 in Dragon #156 by Hartley, Patricia, and Kirk Lesser in "The Role of Computers" column. The reviewers gave the game 5 out of 5 stars.

Reviews
ACE (Advanced Computer Entertainment) - Jan, 1989
ASM (Aktueller Software Markt) - Mar, 1990
Amiga Power - May, 1991
Computer Gaming World - Mar, 1990
The Games Machine - Apr, 1990
ST Format - Apr, 1990
Zero - Mar, 1990

References

External links
Risk at MobyGames

Review in Compute!'s Gazette
Review in Info
Review in Info

1989 video games
Amiga games
Apple II games
Atari ST games
Classic Mac OS games
Commodore 64 games
DOS games
Risk (game)
Video games based on board games
Video games developed in the United States
Virgin Interactive games